Kobrin (or Kobryn or Kobryń) is a city in the Brest voblast of Belarus and the center of the Kobryn Raion.

Kobrin may also refer to:
 Kobrin (surname)
 Kobryn Uezd, former district of Grodno Gubernia province